Poster girl may refer to:

 Poster girl, a female poster child, a prototypical or quintessential example of something
 Poster girl, a model used on posters for her looks 
 Pin-up girl
 Poster Girl (film), a 2010 documentary film
 "Poster Girl", the sixth track on the Backstreet Boys' album Never Gone
 "Poster Girl (Wrong Side of the World)", a song written and performed by Beccy Cole
 Poster Girl (album), a 2021 album by Zara Larsson